Roadog is a motorcycle built by engineer and motorcycle enthusiast Wild Bill Gelbke between 1962 and 1965. A total of two were built. Gelbke, who had attended engineering school in Wisconsin and at University of Southern California, had worked for McDonnell Douglas and also owned two motorcycle shops in Chicago and Hammond, Indiana. He wanted to create a motorcycle that was dependable and was able to cruise at highway speeds comfortably for long periods. Gelbe constructed and welded the frame himself using 4130 chrome-molybdenum tubing, and equipped the machine with a Chevrolet 153 engine and GM powerglide transmission. The shaft drive was constructed from a Chevrolet 1-ton truck differential that was cut in half. Its great size and weight make the bike impossible for most people to steer until it is moving at a speed of at least , and when at rest it is held up by hydraulic rams that are deployed by the driver.

Gelbke was known for riding the bike up and down Cicero Avenue and Addison Street in Chicago in the 1960s, and he made regular cross-country trips on it from 1966 through 1978, logging over 20,000 miles in one year. When he died in 1978, the bikes were put into storage. Posters depicting Gelbke on a Roadog were a popular item among classic motorcycle enthusiasts; in the mid 1980s, motorcycle enthusiast and swap meet organizer Buzz Walneck began searching for the motorcycle, finally placing an ad in his monthly magazine Walneck's Classic Cycle Trader, receiving a tip and discovering a bike at the home of Gelbke's mother. He purchased it and has displayed it at his swap meets and motorcycle shows. Walnek later sold his bike to the National Motorcycle Museum, where it is on display. The other Roadog is privately owned by a Wisconsin man named Anthony Shablak, who "bought it to ride it" but has been unable to find an insurer to cover it.

Roadog introduced several firsts to motorcycle design, including dual headlights, automatic transmission with reverse gear, the hydraulic stands, and front and rear disc brakes. In 2001, Roadog was displayed in a special exhibit at the Museum of Science and Industry in Chicago.

References 

Motorcycles designed by Wild Bill Gelbke
Motorcycles introduced in the 1960s